Tamim Samy Mohamed (born 10 January 2000), is a Qatari born-Egyptian professional footballer who plays as a midfielder for Qatar Stars League side Al Ahli.

Career
Tamim started his career at the youth team of Al Ahli and represented the club at every level.

Career statistics

Club

Notes

References

External links
 

2000 births
Living people
Qatari footballers
Qatari people of Egyptian descent
Naturalised citizens of Qatar
Qatar youth international footballers
Association football midfielders
Al Ahli SC (Doha) players
Qatar Stars League players